

1920s
 1926 Ягідка кохання / Love's Berries, directed by Oleksandr Dovzhenko (silent film)
 1926 Тарас Трясило / Taras Triasylo, directed by Petro Chardynin
 1928 Арсенал / Arsenal, directed by Oleksandr Dovzhenko (silent film)
 1928 Звенигора / Zvenyhora, directed by Oleksandr Dovzhenko (silent film)
 1928 Шкурник / Leather-man, directed by Mykola Shpykovsky (silent film)
 1929 Людина з кіноапаратом / Man with a Movie Camera, directed by Dzyha Vertov (documentary film)

1920s
Films
Ukrainian